Al-Hadi Sharaf ad-Din (1820 – June 8, 1890) was a claimant for the Zaidi imamate of Yemen in the years 1878–1890, acting in opposition to the Ottoman occupiers of the country. His period saw a tribal embryo of a state taking form in the highlands of Yemen, which would be strengthened by his successors as imams, and eventually usher into the expulsion of the Ottoman Turks in the early 20th century.

Accession as resistance leader

Sharaf ad-Din bin Muhammad bin Abd ar-Rahman was a 14th-generation descendant of a medieval imam, al-Mu'ayyad Yahya (d. 1346). He was born in Jeddah while his Yemeni parents performed the hajj, and received a thorough education in the Islamic sciences. The Ottoman Turks occupied San'a in 1872 and brought an end to the old Zaidi state which had existed since 1597. The Imam al-Mutawakkil al-Muhsin refused to submit. He tried to resist the Turkish troops with limited success until his death in 1878. After him, Sharaf ad-Din performed the da'wa (summoning, bid for authority) in Jabal Ahnun which was known as a stronghold for Sayyids and religious scholars. He was elevated to the imamate with the name al-Hadi Sharaf ad-Din. He vowed to continue the struggle and moved to the city Sa'dah north of San'a. In Sa'dah he reinforced religious laws and encouraged qadis to act as judges and administrators in the nearby tribal areas. A fortress was constructed near the city, which became the seat of the imam's government. In Zaidi historiography, his name is sometimes ignored since he did not belong to the Qasimid family that usually provided the imams. He had at least one rival for the imamate, al-Mansur Muhammad (1853–1890). However, competition between the rivals was confined to verbal arguments.

The rebellion of 1884

Turkish legislation by this time was influenced by European models. These so-called Tanzimat reforms were considered heretic by the locals of the Zaidi branch of Shi'a Islam. The pretender-imam was therefore able to keep up the struggle, although Yemen was too split along tribal and religious lines to launch a unified resistance. A concerted attack against the Turkish positions was launched in the summer of 1884, where al-Hadi Sharaf ad-Din strove to subjugate the well-watered regions to the north-west of San'a. He extended his control to the areas around Hajjah and Zafir in the highlands. The Turkish troops besieged Zafir for seven months before the imam's followers withdrew.

Setbacks and further struggle

For a time, the Ottoman governor Izzet Pasha (1882–1884) was able to bring strong pressure on the imam. Izzet assumed control over as-Sudah and chased the imam from the strong fortress Shaharah, which was the key to Sa'dah in the north. The German traveller Eduard Glaser who visited Yemen in 1884 summarized the situation at that time, and described al-Hadi Sharaf ad-Din as a leader of fanatics. At the time of his visit the area controlled by the Turks was restricted to a line between Luhayyah and Hajjah, together with Amran, San'a, Dhamar, Rada, Qa'tabah and the land between Ta'izz and Mocha. The highland tribes Hashid and Bakil were hostile to the Ottoman rule, as was the land to the east and north of San'a. Al-Hadi Sharaf ad-Din finally died in Sa'dah in 1890, and was buried in Jabal Ahnun. In July in the same year the ulema appointed his brother-in-law Muhammad bin Yahya Hamid ad-Din as their new imam, continuing the anti-Turkish struggle.

See also

 Imams of Yemen
 History of Yemen
 Decline of the Ottoman Empire

References

Further reading

Robert W. Stookey, Yemen; The Politics of the Yemen Arab Republic. Boulder 1978.

Zaydi imams of Yemen
1820 births
1890 deaths
19th-century Arabs
19th-century Yemeni people
Ottoman period in Yemen